Christopher Dyason (born 13 March 1948) is a British luger. He competed in the men's doubles event at the 1980 Winter Olympics.

References

External links
 

1948 births
Living people
British male lugers
Olympic lugers of Great Britain
Lugers at the 1980 Winter Olympics
Sportspeople from London